The 2010 World Orienteering Championships, the 27th World Orienteering Championships, were held in Trondheim, Norway, 8 –15 August 2010.

The championships had eight events; sprint for men and women, middle distance for men and women, long distance (formerly called individual or classic distance) for men and women, and relays for men and women.

Medalists

References 

World Orienteering Championships
2010 in Norwegian sport
International sports competitions hosted by Norway
August 2010 sports events in Europe
Orienteering in Norway
Sports competitions in Trondheim
21st century in Trondheim